Kelvin Kyron Jack CM (born 29 April 1976) is a Trinidadian former professional football goalkeeper who is goalkeeping coach at Dover Athletic. He earned 33 caps for Trinidad and Tobago between 1997 and 2006, playing for his country in the 2006 FIFA World Cup.

Playing career
Kelvin Jack started his career playing in Trinidad and Tobago with hometown club Trincity United and Joe Public before earning a scholarship to join Yavapai College in Arizona. While a student there he helped the Roughriders win the NJCAA title in his first year and reach the 3rd position the following year. After finishing college he went to Norway for trials before returning to Trinidad, playing most notably with San Juan Jabloteh for two seasons.

Jack started his career in English football with Reading in 2004, but did not make any appearances for the club. Jack was later sold to Scottish Premier League team Dundee, where he stayed despite their relegation to the Scottish First Division.

Jack was a regular member of the Trinidad and Tobago national football team during the qualifying campaign for the 2006 FIFA World Cup, and travelled to Germany as coach Leo Beenhakker's first-choice goalkeeper. He was expected to play in their first game against Sweden but sustained a calf injury in the warm up, enabling Shaka Hislop to step in. Jack, who would later describe the experience as 'the saddest day of his life', also missed out on playing in the team's second match against England.

Jack did go on to play in the Soca Warriors' final group game against Paraguay, which ended in a 2–0 defeat in which Brent Sancho scored an own goal. The Paraguay match was his final international match.

Following the 2006 FIFA World Cup, Jack signed for Gillingham and made his debut in a 2–1 home win over Huddersfield Town on 5 August. However, in part due to injuries, he made only eleven appearances for the Gills.

In February 2008, Jack joined Barnsley on trial but broke his leg in what was described as a "freak training ground accident". It was announced on 7 May 2008 that he had been released by Gillingham. He had since been training with English lower league clubs Aldershot Town and Southend United in a bid to regain his fitness.

In February 2010, Jack joined Southend United on a short-term contract to act as back-up whilst regular reserve goalkeeper Ian Joyce left on trial with an American club. Without making any appearances he was released at the end of the season on 11 May, and was signed to a one-year contract by Darlington manager Simon Davey for the 2010–11 season. In October, unable to secure a first team place, he joined Kettering Town on a three-month loan. He was released by Darlington in January 2011.

In a bid to keep up his fitness, Jack spent the 2011 pre-season training with Isthmian League Division One South side Maidstone United and appeared in two of the club's pre-season friendlies. Shortly after, on 31 August 2011, Jack made a one-off appearance for Isthmian League Premier Division side AFC Hornchurch, playing in a 2–1 loss away to Lowestoft Town after first-team goalkeeper Darren Behcet picked up an injury. On 11 November 2011, it was announced Jack had again joined up with Maidstone United to cover first-team goalkeeper Charlie Mitten after he suffered a hip injury. He made his debut a day later in a 4–1 win against Ramsgate and made a total of three appearances for the club.

He returned to his former club Kettering Town in March 2012 to provide cover for the injured Laurie Walker, making his debut in their 1–3 defeat to Stockport County on 31 March.

Coaching career
Jack joined the coaching staff of National League side Dover Athletic in the summer of 2020, although he worked behind the scenes until it was announced in early January 2021. He joined a coaching setup consisting of manager Andy Hessenthaler assisted by Jack's former Gillingham teammate Nicky Southall as well as Liam Ridgewell.

Personal life
As a member of the squad that competed at the 2006 FIFA World Cup in Germany, Jack was awarded the Chaconia Medal (Gold Class), the second highest state decoration of Trinidad and Tobago.

He married his longtime girlfriend Shellie-Ann Auguste on 7 June 2007.

References

External links
 Kelvin Jack at FIFA.com
 Interview with Kelvin Jack for The Warrior Nation, courtesy of socawarriors.net
 

1976 births
Living people
Association football goalkeepers
Trinidad and Tobago footballers
Trinidad and Tobago international footballers
Trinidad and Tobago expatriate footballers
2005 CONCACAF Gold Cup players
2006 FIFA World Cup players
TT Pro League players
Scottish Premier League players
English Football League players
W Connection F.C. players
San Juan Jabloteh F.C. players
Dundee F.C. players
Reading F.C. players
Gillingham F.C. players
Southend United F.C. players
Darlington F.C. players
Kettering Town F.C. players
Hornchurch F.C. players
Maidstone United F.C. players
Expatriate footballers in England
Expatriate footballers in Scotland
National League (English football) players
Recipients of the Chaconia Medal
Yavapai Roughriders men's soccer players
Trinidad and Tobago expatriate sportspeople in England
Trinidad and Tobago expatriate sportspeople in Scotland